Menus may be:
 the plural of "menu" (see Menu for use in restaurants, and Menu (computing) for use in user interfaces)
 Les Menus, a commune in France
 "Menus" (New Girl), an episode of the TV series
 Menus of Megara, ancient Greek athlete

See also 
 Menu (disambiguation)